Kim Nam-joon (born September 12, 1994), known professionally as RM (formerly Rap Monster), is a South Korean rapper, singer-songwriter and record producer. He is the leader of South Korean boy band BTS.

RM released his first solo mixtape, RM, in 2015. In 2018, he released his second mixtape, Mono, which peaked at number 26 on the US Billboard 200 and became the highest-charting album by a Korean soloist in chart history at the time. RM made his official solo debut in 2022 with the release of his studio album Indigo, which featured contributions from Erykah Badu and Anderson .Paak. The album peaked at number three on the Billboard 200 and is the highest-charting album by a Korean soloist of all-time. He has also collaborated with artists such as Wale, Younha, Warren G, Gaeko, Krizz Kaliko, MFBTY, Fall Out Boy, Primary, and Lil Nas X.

Early life and education 
Kim Nam-joon was born on September 12, 1994, in Dongjak District, Seoul, South Korea and grew up in Ilsan District, Goyang, where his family moved when he was aged four or five. The elder of two siblings, he has a younger sister. As a child, RM largely learned English by watching the American sitcom Friends with his mother. As a student, he actively wrote poetry and often received awards for his writing. He posted his work to an online poetry website for roughly one year, where he received moderate attention. As a result, RM expressed interest in pursuing a literary career but later decided against it. When he was twelve years old, he studied in New Zealand for four months.

At age 11, in fifth grade, RM became interested in hip-hop music after hearing Epik High's "Fly". Finding that the song had provided him comfort, he decided to look further into the genre. He was introduced to the music of American rapper Eminem by his school teacher, which first sparked RM's interest in lyricism. He would print out lyrics that he felt were "cool" and shared them with friends. RM began songwriting at that time, stating that his poetry became lyrics when it combined with music. In 2007, as a first-year middle school student, he began rapping in local amateur hip-hop circles, creating his first self-composed recording with the program Adobe Audition (then called Cool Edit) and later participating in his first concert in 2008. RM became more active in the underground Korean hip-hop scene under the moniker Runch Randa, releasing a number of tracks and collaborations with other underground rappers such as Zico.

As a student, RM had an IQ of 148 and scored in the top 1% of the nation in the university entrance examinations for language, math, foreign language and social studies. Because his parents had been strongly opposed to his interest in a musical career due to his academic achievements, RM initially decided to set music aside to focus on his studies. He eventually convinced his mother to allow him to be a rapper, asking her if "she wanted to have a son who was a first-place rapper, or a 5,000th-place student".

In March 2019, after graduating from Global Cyber University with a degree in Broadcasting and Entertainment, RM enrolled at Hanyang Cyber University's Master of Business Administration program in Advertising and Media.

Name 
RM selected the name "Rap Monster" during his time as an idol trainee. The name derives from the lyrics of a song he wrote, inspired by San E's "Rap Genius". The lyrics contained a segment where San E declares he should be called a "rap monster" as he "raps non-stop". He adopted the stage name because he felt it was "cool". RM has described himself as having a love-hate relationship with the name, feeling that it was not selected for being of "incredible value" to him.

He formally changed his stage name to "RM" in November 2017, as he determined that "Rap Monster" was no longer representative of who he was or the music that he creates. In an interview with Entertainment Tonight in 2019, RM stated that the name "could symbolize many things" and "could have more spectrums to it." One meaning that has been suggested is "Real Me".

Career

2010–2013: Joining Big Hit Entertainment and debut with BTS 
In 2009, RM auditioned for Big Deal Records, passing the first round along with Samuel Seo but failing the second round after forgetting lyrics. However, following the audition, rapper Sleepy exchanged contact information with RM, whom he later mentioned to Big Hit Entertainment producer Pdogg. In 2010, Sleepy contacted RM, encouraging him to audition for Big Hit Entertainment CEO Bang Si-hyuk. Bang offered RM, then aged 16, a spot at the record label, which he accepted immediately and without his parents' knowledge. Bang and Pdogg soon began forming a hip hop group that would eventually become the idol group BTS.

RM trained for three years with fellow rapper Min Yoon-gi and dancer Jung Ho-seok, later known as Suga and J-Hope, respectively. During this three-year trainee period, RM performed on five pre-debut tracks credited to BTS in 2010 and 2011. He also worked as a songwriter for girl group Glam and helped pen their debut single "Party (XXO)", a pro-LGBTQ song that was praised by Billboard as "one of the most forward-thinking songs out of a K-pop girl group in the past decade." On June 13, 2013, RM made his debut with BTS and has since produced and written lyrics for many tracks on their albums. On August 29, 2013, RM performed the intro track to BTS' first extended play (EP) O!RUL8,2?, which was released as a trailer ahead of the EP's September 11 release, marking his first solo after debuting.

2014–2016: First solo collaborations, RM, and Problematic Men  

On August 5, 2014, Big Hit Entertainment released a trailer for BTS' first studio album Dark & Wild, which was set to be released on August 20. The rap track, officially credited to BTS as "Intro: What Am I to You?", was a solo performed by RM. Through reality television show American Hustle Life, which was used to produce Dark & Wild, RM formed a working relationship with Warren G, who offered to write BTS a beat. In an interview with Korean magazine Hip Hop Playa, Warren G stated that he had befriended BTS through the program and had kept in touch with the band after they returned to South Korea. On March 4, 2015, RM released a single with Warren G entitled, "P.D.D (Please Don't Die)" ahead of his first solo mixtape RM following an offer by Warren G to collaborate. The track reflected how RM felt towards those who hated and criticized him at the time, which he used to find very upsetting. That same March, RM collaborated with hip hop project group MFBTY, EE and Dino J on the song "Bucku Bucku". He featured in the song's music video and also had a cameo appearance in a music video for another song by MFBTY, "Bang Diggy Bang Bang". RM had first formed a lasting working relationship with MFBTY member Tiger JK after meeting and expressing admiration for him on a TV show in 2013, when Tiger JK was promoting his song "The Cure".

RM was cast as a regular on the Korean variety program Problematic Men, where cast members were given a variety of puzzles and problems to solve and work through by discussing their own thoughts and experiences. The program began airing on February 26, 2015; however, RM left the show after 22 episodes due to BTS' 2015 Red Bullet world tour.

On March 17, 2015, RM released his first solo mixtape, RM, which ranked 48th on Spin's "50 Best Hip Hop Albums of 2015". The mixtape addressed a variety of topics, such as RM's past on the track "Voice" and the idea that "you're you and I'm me" in the track "Do You". When discussing the track "God Rap", RM described himself as an atheist, believing that only he could determine his fate. The production process for the mixtape lasted around four or five months, with RM working on it in between BTS' activities. The following year, RM recalled that he had largely written about the negative emotions he had been carrying, such as anger and rage, but stated that the songs are not "100% under [his] sovereignty" and that he felt many parts of the mixtape were "immature". He also added that he hoped his next mixtape to be something he worked on by himself. Following RM's release, he featured along with Kwon Jin-ah on Primary's "U" that April. In August, RM collaborated with Marvel for Fantastic Four's soundtrack in Korea, releasing the digital single, "Fantastic" featuring Mandy Ventrice through Melon, Genie, Naver Music and other music platforms. In August 2016, vocal duo Homme released a single titled "Dilemma", which was co-produced by RM and Bang Si-hyuk.

2017–2021: Second mixtape Mono and further collaborations 
In March 2017, RM collaborated with American rapper Wale on a special socially-charged track called "Change", released as a free digital download along with an accompanying music video filmed two weeks prior to the track's release. The pair first formed a relationship over Twitter, with Wale reaching out to RM in 2016, having seen RM's cover of his track "Illest Bitch". RM decided on the topic of "Change", saying that though the two rappers were extremely different, their commonality lay in the fact that both America and South Korea had their political and social situations and that both of them wanted the world to change for the better. One month later, RM featured on the track "Gajah" with Gaeko of Dynamic Duo. In December, RM collaborated on a remix of Fall Out Boy's song "Champion". The track reached number 18 on Billboard'''s Bubbling Under Hot 100 Singles and helped RM reach number 46 on the Emerging Artists Chart for the week of January 8, 2018. On December 27, RM made history as the first K-pop artist to chart on the Rock Digital Songs chart, placing at number two.

RM released his second mixtape, Mono, which he referred to as a "playlist", on October 23, 2018. He became the first Korean artist to rank number one on the Emerging Artists Chart in the United States with its release. The playlist was well-received by critics, who praised RM for laying "his deep insecurities bare on songs like 'Tokyo' and 'Seoul'". The track "Seoul" was produced by British electropop duo Honne, who first discovered RM after seeing him recommend their music on Twitter and eventually met him in Seoul following one of their concerts. In November, RM also collaborated with Tiger JK on his last and final album under the stage name Drunken Tiger, featuring on the track "Timeless". Tiger JK originally expected RM's lyrics to contain self-praise, which was the trend of rap at the time; RM instead wrote lyrics about leaving behind the historical meaning of Drunken Tiger's name.

On March 25, 2019, Honne announced that RM would feature on their remake of "Crying Over You" alongside singer BEKA, which was released on March 27. Honne originally released "Crying Over You" with BEKA in 2018. The song was originally slated for a January 2019 release but postponed due to "unforeseen circumstances". Chinese singer Bibi Zhou was added to the Chinese release, appearing with RM and replacing BEKA. The same day, Big Hit Entertainment released the song "Persona" as a trailer for BTS' EP Map of the Soul: Persona, performed as a solo by RM. Persona debuted at number 17 on Billboards YouTube Song Chart. Three months later, on July 24, 2019, RM featured on the fourth official remix of Lil Nas X's "Old Town Road," entitled "Seoul Town Road", in which he "infuse[d]...his English-language verse with a surprisingly good Southern twang". On December 29, it was announced that RM would feature on Younha's track "Winter Flower", released on January 6, 2020. RM also featured on "Don't", the lead single of Korean singer eAeon's second solo album released on April 30, 2021.

 2022–present: Solo debut and second phase for BTS 
During BTS' ninth anniversary celebrations in June 2022, RM announced that the band members would be devoting more attention to individual music endeavors going forward and that future projects would no longer be released as free or unpromoted mixtapes but as commercial albums, complete with promotional activities, instead. He wanted to think about BTS’ new direction, both as a group and as growing individuals, saying that the K-pop idol system does not give them time to mature. "You have to keep producing music and keep doing something," he added.

RM subsequently appeared as a featured artist on the single "Sexy Nukim" by alt-K-pop group Balming Tiger in September, and released his debut solo studio album, Indigo, led by the single "Wild Flower", on December 2. The album peaked at number three on the Billboard 200, making him the highest-charting Korean soloist in chart history. In March 2023, RM traveled to Spain for inspiration for a second solo album. During an intervew with EFE, he reflected on the search for his own identity, having followed the dictates of K-pop trends for so long. "After 10 years as a member of BTS, I didn’t know who I was and I wanted to know," RM said, adding that he has gone back to "thinking about the beginnings and the real reasons" he initially joined BTS. He also discussed his solo efforts, upcoming enlistment, and entering a new phase for BTS, "When you are famous, staying on top is very difficult, but I think BTS will make it. It will come together again when we finish our military service, and we will look for new synergies between us to enter a second phase."

 Artistry and impact 
RM is a baritone. In 2017, American hip-hop magazine XXL included him in its list of "10 Korean Rappers You Should Know", with writer Peter A. Berry stating that "Rap Monster rarely fails to live up to his name". Berry described RM as "one of the region's most dexterous rappers, capable of switching flows effortlessly as he glides across an array of diverse instrumentals". Crystal Tai of the South China Morning Post noted that RM has "received much praise for his natural flow and lyrics". Speaking about RM's work, Noiseys Bianca Mendez wrote that "he's got some My Beautiful Dark Twisted Fantasy [by Kanye West] in him, but he's closer to...Earl Sweatshirt and Chance the Rapper in spirit, and that's exciting". In January 2020, he was promoted from associate to a full member of the Korea Music Copyright Association.

In a survey conducted by Gallup Korea, RM ranked as the 12th most preferred idol of the year for 2018. He ranked 11th in 2019. In 2018, RM was awarded the fifth-class Hwagwan Order of Cultural Merit by the President of South Korea, along with the other members of BTS, for his contributions to spreading Korean culture.  In July 2021, he and the members of BTS were appointed Special Presidential Envoy for Future Generations and Culture by President Moon Jae-in to help "lead the global agenda for future generations, such as sustainable growth" and "expand South Korea's diplomatic efforts and global standing" in the international community.

 Personal life 
RM underwent septoplasty for his nasal septum deviation in 2018 and temporarily withdrew from band activities while recovering from the operation.

Since 2018, RM has lived in Hannam-dong, Seoul, South Korea with his bandmates. In November 2019, he bought a property in the Yongsan District of Seoul for ₩4.9 billion, then sold it the following year for ₩5.8 billion. He later bought another home in Hannam-dong worth US$5.7 million.

 Philanthropy 

For his 25th birthday, RM donated ₩100 million to the Seoul Samsun School to help hearing-impaired students receive music education. In December 2020, the Arts Council of Korea named him one of its ten 2020 Patrons of the Arts in recognition of his ₩100 million donation to the National Museum of Modern and Contemporary Art for the printing and distribution of various rare art books to schools and libraries in rural and mountainous regions. Since September 2021, he has consecutively donated ₩100 million annually towards the preservation and restoration of cultural artifacts overseas, through the Cultural Heritage Administration (CHA) and the Overseas Cultural Heritage Foundation. His first donation, originally made privately, was used for treatment of a hwarot owned by the Los Angeles County Museum of Art (LACMA) at the time, while his 2022 donation was used for the creation of an art brochure introducing Korean paintings.

 Awards and nominations 

 Discography Studio albums Indigo (2022)Mixtapes RM (2015)
 Mono (2018)As songwriter'''

Filmography

Television

Music videos

Trailers and short films

References

External links 

1994 births
Living people
Rappers from Seoul
South Korean atheists
South Korean male rappers
South Korean record producers
South Korean hip hop record producers
South Korean singer-songwriters
South Korean male singer-songwriters
South Korean male pop singers
South Korean male idols
South Korean baritones
Japanese-language singers of South Korea
English-language singers from South Korea
BTS members
21st-century South Korean singers
Recipients of the Order of Cultural Merit (Korea)
Hybe Corporation artists